The Catholic Church in Nigeria is mainly composed of a Latin hierarchy, joined in a national Episcopal Conference of Nigeria, and a single Eastern Catholic (transnational) see, comprising:
 9 Latin rite ecclesiastical provinces, each under a Metropolitan Archbishop, with a total of 44 suffragan dioceses 
 one missionary apostolic vicariate
 one Maronite diocese, for all Western and Central Africa
There are no titular sees. All defunct jurisdictions have current successor sees.

There is an Apostolic Nunciature (papal diplomatic representation at embassy-level) to Nigeria in the national capital Abuja; in it is also vested the papal Permanent Observer to Economic Community of West African States (ECOWAS).

Eastern Catholic

Exempt (directly under the Holy See) 
 Maronite Catholic Eparchy of Annunciation of Ibadan, with see in Ibadan, Oyo state

Current Latin Sees

Ecclesiastical Province of Abuja
 Metropolitan Archdiocese of Abuja, official website 
Diocese of Gboko
Diocese of Idah
Diocese of Katsina-Ala
Diocese of Lafia, official website 
Diocese of Lokoja
Diocese of Makurdi
Diocese of Otukpo

Ecclesiastical Province of Benin City
 Metropolitan Archdiocese of Benin City, official website 
Diocese of Auchi, official website 
Diocese of Issele-Uku, official website 
Diocese of Uromi, official website 
Diocese of Warri, official website 
Diocese of Bomadi

Ecclesiastical Province of Calabar
 Metropolitan Archdiocese of Calabar
Diocese of Ikot Ekpene, official website 
Diocese of Ogoja
Diocese of Port Harcourt
Diocese of Uyo, official website

Ecclesiastical Province of Ibadan
 Metropolitan Archdiocese of Ibadan, official website 
Diocese of Ekiti, official website 
Diocese of Ilorin
Diocese of Ondo, official website 
Diocese of Osogbo
Diocese of Oyo, official website

Ecclesiastical Province of Jos
 Metropolitan Archdiocese of Jos, official website 
Diocese of Bauchi, official website  
Diocese of Jalingo
Diocese of Maiduguri
Diocese of Pankshin
Diocese of Shendam
Diocese of Wukari
Diocese of Yola

Ecclesiastical Province of Kaduna
 Metropolitan Archdiocese of Kaduna, official website 
Diocese of Kafanchan, official website 
Diocese of Kano
Diocese of Kontagora
Diocese of Minna
Diocese of Sokoto
Diocese of Zaria, official website , Scribd.com page

Ecclesiastical Province of Lagos
 Metropolitan Archdiocese of Lagos, official website 
Diocese of Abeokuta, official website 
Diocese of Ijebu-Ode

Ecclesiastical Province of Onitsha
 Metropolitan Archdiocese of Onitsha, official website 
Diocese of Abakaliki, official website 
Diocese of Awgu
Diocese of Awka, official website 
Diocese of Enugu, official website 
Diocese of Nnewi, official website 
Diocese of Nsukka
Diocese of Ekwulobia, official website

Ecclesiastical Province of Owerri
 Metropolitan Archdiocese of Owerri, official website 
Diocese of Aba, official website 
Diocese of Ahiara, official website 
Diocese of Okigwe, official website 
Diocese of Orlu, official website 
Diocese of Umuahia, official website

See also 

 Catholic dioceses (structured view)
 Outline of Nigeria
 Index of Nigeria-related articles

Sources and external links 
 GCatholic.org - data for all sections.
 Catholic Bishops' Conference of Nigeria
 Catholic News Service of Nigeria
 Catholic-Hierarchy entry.
 Nigerian Catholic Diocesan Priests Association (NCDPA)
 Jurisdictions and Ordinaries in Nigeria

Nigeria
Nigeria religion-related lists